Roger Waterss primary instrument is the electric bass guitar. He briefly played a Höfner bass but replaced it with a Rickenbacker RM-1999/4001S, until around 1970 when he switched to Fender Precision basses. He often plays bass using a pick but is also known to play fingerstyle. Not only a bassist and vocalist, Waters has experimented with the EMS Synthi A and VCS 3 synthesisers and has played electric rhythm and acoustic guitars in recordings and in concert. Throughout his career he has used Selmer, WEM, Hiwatt and Ashdown amplifiers, also employing delay, tremolo, chorus, panning and phaser effects in his music.

His solo career has included four studio albums: The Pros and Cons of Hitchhiking (1984), Radio K.A.O.S. (1987), Amused to Death (1992), and Is This the Life We Really Want? (2017). The Pros and Cons of Hitch Hiking, has been certified Gold by the RIAA. Amused to Death is Waters' most critically acclaimed solo recording to date, garnering some comparison to his previous work with Pink Floyd. Waters described the record as "a stunning piece of work", ranking the album with The Dark Side of the Moon and The Wall as one of the best of his career. The album had one hit, the song "What God Wants, Part 1", which reached number 35 in the UK in September 1992 and number 5 on Billboards Mainstream Rock chart in the US. Amused to Death was certified Silver by the British Phonographic Industry. Jeff Beck played lead guitar on many of the album's tracks, which were recorded with an impressive cast of studio musicians at ten different studios. Sales of Amused to Death topped out at around one million and there was no tour in support of this album. Waters would first perform material from it seven years later during his In the Flesh tour.

In 1986, he contributed songs and a score to the soundtrack of the movie When the Wind Blows based on the Raymond Briggs book of the same name. In 1990, he staged one of the largest rock concerts in history, The Wall – Live in Berlin, on the vacant terrain between Potsdamer Platz and the Brandenburg Gate, with an estimated 200,000 people in attendance. In 1996, Waters was inducted into the US and UK Rock and Roll Hall of Fame as a member of Pink Floyd. He has toured extensively as a solo act since 1999 and played The Dark Side of the Moon in its entirety for his world tours of 2006–2008. In 2005, he released , an opera in three acts translated from Etienne Roda-Gil and his wife Nadine Delahaye's libretto about the early French Revolution. On 2 July 2005, he reunited with other members of Pink Floyd—Nick Mason, Richard Wright, and David Gilmour—for the Live 8 concert in London's Hyde Park, Pink Floyd's only appearance with Waters since their performance of The Wall at Earls Court in London 24 years earlier. In 2010, he commenced The Wall Live tour, which concluded in 2013.

Albums

Studio albums

Soundtracks

Live albums

Compilation albums

Operas

Other albums

Video albums

Box sets

Singles

Collaborations and other appearances

Music videos

Citations

References

External links

Waters, Roger
Waters, Roger
Discography